Far infrared (FIR) is a region in the infrared spectrum of electromagnetic radiation. Far infrared is often defined as any radiation with a wavelength of 15 micrometers (μm) to 1 mm (corresponding to a range of about 20 THz to 300 GHz), which places far infrared radiation within the CIE IR-B and IR-C bands. The long-wave side of the FIR spectrum overlaps with so named terahertz radiation. Different sources use different boundaries for the far infrared; for example, astronomers sometimes define far infrared as wavelengths between 25 μm and 350 μm.

Visible light includes radiation with wavelengths between 400 nm and 700 nm, meaning that far infrared photons have tens to hundreds of times less energy than visible light photons.

Applications

Astronomy

Due to black-body radiation, objects with temperatures between about 5 K and 340 K will emit radiation in the far infrared range according to Wien's displacement law. This property is sometimes used to observe interstellar gases where new stars are often formed.

For example, the center of the Milky Way galaxy is very bright in far infrared images because the dense concentration of stars there heats the surrounding dust and causes it to emit radiation in this part of the spectrum. Disregarding the center of our own galaxy, the brightest far infrared object in the sky is the galaxy M82, which radiates as much far infrared light from its central region as all of the stars in the Milky Way combined. This is due to the dust at the center of M82 being heated by an unknown source.

Human body detection

Some human proximity sensors use passive infrared sensing in the far infrared wavelength to detect both static and/or moving human bodies.

Therapeutic modality

Although all radiant heat is electromagnetic radiation, researchers have noted that only the far-infrared radiation band transfers energy purely in the form of heat that can be perceived by the human body as such. They report that this radiant heat can penetrate up to 1.5 inches (almost 4 cm) beneath the skin. Biomedical researchers have experimented with the use of FIR-emitting ceramics which are embedded into various fibers and woven into the fabric of garments. These researchers noted in subjects a "delay" in the "onset of fatigue induced by muscle contractions." They propose that this ceramic-emitted FIR (cFIR) has the potential to promote cell repair.

Some heating pads are sold as providing "far infrared" therapy which purports to provide "deeper" penetration. Since the infrared radiation of an object is determined by its temperature, all heating pads provide the same infrared radiation if they are at the same temperature. Higher temperatures will provide greater infrared radiation but the user must be careful to avoid burns.

References

External links
 Far infrared radiation (FIR): its biological effects and medical applications
 Challenging a Myth and Misconception: Red-Light Vision in Rats

Infrared